John Graydon (1693 - July 1774) was an Irish politician.

Graydon represented Harristown in the Irish House of Commons from 1727 to 1760.

References

1693 births
1774 deaths
Irish MPs 1727–1760
Members of the Parliament of Ireland (pre-1801) for County Kildare constituencies